Col de Joux Plane (el. 1691 m.) is a high mountain pass in the Alps in Haute-Savoie, France, linking Morzine with Samoëns. The climb has been featured several times in the Tour de France cycling race

Climb details
Starting from Samoëns, the Col de Joux Plane is 11.7 km long with an average percentage of 8.5% and a maximum gradient of 10%.
Starting from Morzine, the Col de Joux Plane is 10.9 km long with an average percentage of 6.5% and a maximum gradient of 11%.

Tour de France
Col de Joux Plane has been used a total of 12 times by the Tour de France since its debut in 1978.

See also
 List of highest paved roads in Europe
 List of mountain passes

Notes

External links
Col de Joux Plane profile from Samoens at climbbybike.com
Col de Joux Plane profile from Morzine at climbbybike.com
Col de Joux Plane on Google Maps (Tour de France classic climbs)
Col de Joux Plane on Facebook

References

Mountain passes of the Alps
Mountain passes of Auvergne-Rhône-Alpes
Landforms of Haute-Savoie
Transport in Auvergne-Rhône-Alpes